Brochwel son of Cyngen (died c. 560), better known as Brochwel Ysgithrog, was a king of Powys in eastern Wales. The unusual epithet Ysgithrog has been translated as "of the canine teeth", "the fanged" or "of the tusk" (perhaps because of big teeth, horns on a helmet or, most likely, his aggressive manner).

Family
Brochwel was the son of King Cyngen Glodrydd and his wife St. Tudlwystl, a daughter of Brychan ap Gwyngwen ap Tewdr. As far as is known, Brochwel married Arddyn Benasgel, sometimes written Arddun Penasgell (Wing Headed), daughter of King Pabo Post Prydain. They were the parents of King Cynan Garwyn and Saint Tysilio, the founder of the old church at Meifod.

Poetry and tradition
Powys has been frequently called "the land of Brochwel", but little is recorded of the events of this monarch's reign. Some details are available from Old Welsh poetry, but this has been difficult to interpret, and none of the extant poems about this period seem to pre-date the 9th century; some are from as late as the 11th century.

Brochwel is presented as a warrior hero and ruler of wide lands. These sources suggest that he was passionately fond of hunting, and one of his chief resorts was the Vale of Meifod, which he made his "May-Abode" or summer residence. On his summer visits to Mathrafal, he often visited the shrine of Saint Gwyddfarch. Upon his saintly son, Saint Tysilio, he bestowed the bishopric of that part of his kingdom. Tysilio and Brochwel are linked with the foundation of the Church at Meifod, but none of the stones of the current Church of St. Mary date from this period.

The arms later assigned by the College of Arms to Brochwel, and that can be used by his male heirs, are ‘Sable, three nags' heads, erased argent’ which may represent three beheaded Saxon white horses. Many later tribes and family lines in the area claim descent from Brochwel and include his arms within theirs. Most of the genealogies of these families were first documented by the heralds in the 16th century when the view taken of Brochwel can be illustrated by the following quotation:

Pengwern was certainly a Welsh kingdom or Royal residence which appears to have been located somewhere in Shropshire. It is unclear whether it was ruled by Brochwel. However, there does seem to have been a tradition that he was buried in St. Chad's College in Shrewsbury which he is said to have founded. Alternatively, some believe that Brochwel was buried at Pentrefoelas in Gwynedd where the grave has been uncovered of a six-foot man, with a covering slab bearing the name ‘Brohomagli’.

False Brochwel
According to Bede (Bk II, Ch 2), a 'Brochmail' was also one of the defending force when the monks of Bangor-on-Dee were slain by Æthelfrith of Northumbria at the Battle of Chester, circa 613. The account of the battle in the Welsh Chronicles is consistent with Bede, but since it was written after his work the author was probably aware of it. However, this man is clearly not Brochwel, as his grandson, Selyf ap Cynan, was King of Powys at this time and is described as dying in the battle. References to the subject as 'Brochfael' are probably due to a mistaken identification with the person referred to by Bede.

References 
Kari Maund (2000) The Welsh Kings: The Medieval Rulers of Wales (Tempus)
John Edward Lloyd (1911) A History of Wales from the Earliest Times to the Edwardian Conquest (Longmans, Green & Co.)
W.A. Griffiths (1915) Tales from Welsh History and Romance (J & J Bennett Ltd, The Century Press)

Monarchs of Powys
House of Gwertherion
6th-century Welsh monarchs
Taliesin
560 deaths
Year of death uncertain
Year of birth unknown